Days of Defiance is the sixth studio album by Greek heavy metal band Firewind. It was released on 25 October 2010 in Europe and 26 October in North America.

The guitars, bass, keyboards and drums were recorded at Sound Symmetry Studios and Zero Gravity Studios in Greece while the vocals were recorded at Studio Landgren 5,0 in Sweden. All backing vocals were recorded by Marcus Pålsson. The artwork was done by Gustavo Sazes.

Track listing

Singles
Two singles were released from Days of Defiance: "World on Fire" and "Embrace The Sun".

Personnel 
Apollo Papathanasio – vocals
Gus G. – lead guitars
Bob Katsionis – rhythm guitars and keyboards
Petros Christo – bass
Mark Cross - drums (credited for recording all drums on the album, no longer a member and not featured in album promotional material and artwork)
Michael Ehré – drums (recorded none of the material with the exception of "Breaking the Law")

References 

2010 albums
Firewind albums
Century Media Records albums